The Danane concentration camp was an Italian concentration camp established near Mogadishu in Italian East Africa after the Second Italo-Ethiopian War. The camp is recorded as having a population of 6,000 people, mostly Ethiopians that resisted the Italian rule in Italian East Africa. Many accounts report that half of the camp's population died from malnutrition, malaria, and other diseases.

See also
Italian concentration camps
Italian East Africa

References

Italian concentration camps
Italian East Africa
Somalia in World War II